The Sexplorer (US title: The Girl from Starship Venus, UK re-release title: Diary of a Space Virgin) is a 1975 British sex comedy film directed by Derek Ford. The film was produced by Morton M. Lewis. The film also has a hardcore version for the foreign market.

Cast
 Monika Ringwald - The Explorer
 Mark Jones - Lecher
 Andrew Grant - Allan
 Anthony Kenyon - Man in Cinema
 David Rayner - Photographer
 Beatrice Shaw - Old Lady
 Michael Cronin - Doctor
 Prudence Drage - Sauna Attendant
 Anna Dawson - Store Manageress
 Tanya Ferova - Stripper

References

External links
 

1970s English-language films
British sex comedy films
British sexploitation films
1975 films
Films shot in England
Films set in England
1970s sex comedy films
1979 comedy films
1979 films
1976 comedy films
1976 films
1975 comedy films
2000s English-language films
Films directed by Derek Ford
1970s British films
2000s British films